The Very Best of Dusty Springfield is a compilation album by Dusty Springfield, released by Mercury Records on 21 April 1998.

Critical reception

William Ruhlmann of AllMusic writes, "The result, in terms of song selection, is an excellent 20-song, 57-minute disc that includes most of her best-known material." His major gripe was the song order as laid out by the producer. It was not in order of release and mixed up stereo and mono tracks, which he thought was unnecessary and distracting to the listener.

Robert Christgau gives the compilation an A−.

Track listing

Track information and credits adapted from the album's liner notes.

References

1998 compilation albums
Mercury Records compilation albums
Dusty Springfield compilation albums